Leucopogon obtusatus is a species of flowering plant in the heath family Ericaceae and is endemic to the south-west of Western Australia. The flowers are arranged in short, dense spikes on the ends of branches or in upper leaf axils with leaf-like bracts and broad bracteoles less than half as long as the sepals.

The species was first formally described in 1845 by Otto Wilhelm Sonder in Lehmann's Plantae Preissianae from specimens collected near York in 1839. The specific epithet (obtusatus) means "blunt-possessing", referring to the leaf tips.

Leucopogon obtusatus occurs in the Avon Wheatbelt, Esperance Plains, Jarrah Forest and Mallee bioregions of south-western Western Australia and is listed "not threatened" by the Western Australian Government Department of Biodiversity, Conservation and Attractions.

References

obtusatus
Ericales of Australia
Flora of Western Australia
Plants described in 1845
Taxa named by Otto Wilhelm Sonder